Grebenstchikov House of Prayer is an Old Believers place of worship in Riga, the capital of Latvia. It is situated at the address 73 Krasta Street.

History
The Grebenstchikov congregation is affiliated with the Pomorian Old-Orthodox Church, a priestless Old Believer denomination.
The congregation, established no later than 1760, is considered the oldest extant Old Believer congregation in the world. With an estimated 25,000 worshipers, the parish is considered as the world's largest.

References 

Religious buildings and structures in Riga
Old Believer movement
Churches in Latvia